"Listen to the Music" is a song recorded by the Doobie Brothers on their second album Toulouse Street. The song was the Doobie Brothers' first big hit in 1972. It was written by Tom Johnston.

Song
Writer Tom Johnston described the motivation for the song as a call for world peace:
"The chord structure of it made me think of something positive, so the lyrics that came out of that were based on this utopian idea that if the leaders of the world got together on some grassy hill somewhere and either smoked enough dope or just sat down and just listened to the music and forgot about all this other bullshit, the world would be a much better place. It was very utopian and very unrealistic (laughs). It seemed like a good idea at the time."

The studio recording used both a banjo and a prominent flanging effect, audible from the bridge until the fadeout. When released as a single by Warner Bros. Records, the song peaked at number 11 on the Billboard Hot 100 in November 1972.

The commercial success of "Listen to the Music" helped the album Toulouse Street rise on the charts. The song remains a staple of adult contemporary and classic rock radio. The band also uses it as an encore song during live shows. Patrick Simmons, the second guitarist and vocalist in the group, sings the bridge of the song.

Ultimate Classic Rock critic Michael Gallucci rated "Listen to the Music" as the Doobie Brothers fourth-greatest song, praising the smooth, "soft, shuffling rhythm" and Johnston's vocal performance. The staff of Billboard rated it even higher, considering it the Doobie Brothers' best song, saying that it "ranks high in the pantheon of rock n’ roll feel-good hits" and should "get your foot tapping and bring a bit of a smile to your face."

In June 2020, four members of the band released an acoustic version of the song on YouTube, with each performing from his home during the COVID-19 pandemic; the recording included a more prominent banjo part, but no lead electric guitar or drums.  At the end of the recording, lead singer Tom Johnston noted that it was a benefit performance, of sorts, for Feeding America, and gave the organization's URL, encouraging fans to donate.

Personnel
The Doobie Brothers:
Tom Johnston – guitars, lead vocals, backing vocals
Patrick Simmons – guitars, banjo, lead vocals (bridge), backing vocals
Tiran Porter – bass, backing vocals
John (Little John) Hartman – drums, tambourine
Michael Hossack – drums, steel drums

Additional personnel:
Ted Templeman – percussion

Chart performance

Weekly charts

Year-end charts

Remix
The song received a remix by Steve Rodway a.k.a. Motiv8 in 1994, which eventually peaked at #37 UK.

Cover versions
"Listen to the Music" was covered by Sonny & Cher on their 1973 LP Mama Was a Rock and Roll Singer, Papa Used to Write All Her Songs, and by The Isley Brothers on their 1973 LP 3 + 3.

References

External links
 

1972 songs
1972 singles
The Doobie Brothers songs
The Isley Brothers songs
Songs written by Tom Johnston (musician)
Song recordings produced by Ted Templeman
Songs about music
Warner Records singles